Begonia brandbygeana is a species of plant in the family Begoniaceae. It is endemic to Ecuador. Its natural habitat is subtropical or tropical moist lowland forests. It is threatened by habitat loss.

References

Flora of Ecuador
brandbygeana
Vulnerable plants
Taxonomy articles created by Polbot
Plants described in 1986